Piedmont Middle School (PMS) is part of the Piedmont Unified School District in Piedmont, California.

Background
Piedmont Middle School provides education for students grades six through eight in the city. Piedmont students come from Frank C. Havens Elementary School, Wildwood Elementary School, and Egbert W. Beach Elementary School. Once they reach sixth grade, they are mixed together in the middle school, along with students from other districts who move to Piedmont.

The school district of Piedmont is noted for strong academics.

Location

The school is located next to the joint building of Millennium High School and Piedmont High School. It overlooks Witter Field and has a view of the west side of Piedmont, of Lake Merritt and Oakland, and, when there is little fog, the Bay and San Francisco. Located on Magnolia Avenue, the middle school is opposite the Piedmont Recreation Department.

Like most Piedmont schools, the middle school is in the center of town, and is only a few blocks away from Mulberry's Market, several banks, the police station, and a gas station.

Campus

Although the school has closed lunch, much of the campus is open to the air. The campus sprawls from its street entrance to Witter Field at the back and Piedmont High School on the right.

Architecture

Unlike the high school, which was originally built in a neoclassical design in the 1920s, the middle school's design is reflective of its construction in the 1970s.

Piedmont Middle School is made of several buildings, including the main building, which holds classrooms for core, math, social studies, English, and various electives, as well as a gymnasium ("the old gym"), Food Service; the science buildings, which are lower than the main building; and the P.E./music building, which includes a gymnasium ("the new gym"), locker rooms and rooms for band and orchestra. The main building has three floors, with the majority of sixth-grade classrooms on the first floor and the seventh- and eighth-grade classrooms dispersed throughout the school- which tumbles down a fairly steep hillside.

Much of the school is made of concrete with fake brick layers. Only a few buildings — such as the science and P.E. buildings — are completely indoors. The main building has open hallways. Most hallways and many classroom have views of the Bay.

History

When Piedmont High School was created in 1921, it included grades seven through twelve, split into a junior high school and a senior high school. Piedmont Junior High School, grades seven through nine, became a separate entity from the senior high in the late 1960s, but the name change to Piedmont Middle School and switch to grades six through eight did not occur until a decade later.

When the high school was demolished for safety reasons in the mid-1970s, the separate junior high building was constructed. The dedication was made on June 1, 1975.

Academics

In 2005, the school's API score was a 918. Ninety-eight percent of teachers are fully credentialed, and the average teaching experience is 15 years.

Schedule
The school runs on a block schedule, with all 7 classes on Mondays and Fridays and a rotating schedule on Tuesday-Thursday.

Core
"Core" class aid in the transition from elementary to middle school. "Core" is a series of classes taught by the same teacher in the same room, much like the main teacher in elementary school. Sixth graders are taught reading, language arts and social studies by their core teacher. Seventh graders are taught reading, language arts, and social studies, but have a separate teacher for math. By eighth grade, the core system is nonexistent.  Other classes not taught by core teachers including science teachers, physical education teachers, and elective teachers.

Foreign language
All seventh graders may begin a foreign language their second semester. Languages offered are Spanish, French, and Mandarin. If a student chooses Spanish, they take Spanish A in seventh grade and Spanish BC in eighth. These equal Spanish I in high school, and so by ninth grade they can take Spanish II. Students who do not take a foreign language in middle school, or who do not meet the minimum grade requirements to continue, start from the introductory level, such as Spanish I, when they reach high school.

Electives
All sixth graders participate in the elective wheel, which rotates them through different electives, including drama, Green Team, art, Makers class, computers, and Communications. By seventh and eighth grade, students are allowed to pick a semester- or year-long elective.

Semester- and year-long electives offered include foreign language, ASB, drama, art, ceramics, woodshop, music (band and orchestra), filmmaking, Green Team, Shakespeare, and computer arts and graphics. Journalism, another elective, involves students in the production of the student newspaper, The Globe.  The yearbook elective, for seventh and eighth graders, is a class where students create the annual yearbook.

Physical education

All students are required to take physical education unless they participate in an outside athletic, such as gymnastics, for a certain number of hours a week. In sixth grade, P.E. may be taken with band/orchestra so that students take P.E. every other day and music the remaining days. In seventh and eighth grade, P.E. is an everyday class. Students are required to wear a standard Piedmont P.E. T-shirt, along with purple shorts. The uniform may be purchased from the school. Students are required to run the mile weekly, if they take full-time P.E. If they do not, which may only occur in sixth-grade, they run the mile every other week.

While teacher curricula differ, sports played in P.E. include hockey, ultimate frisbee, soccer, bocce ball, juggling, rock-climbing, basketball, paddle tennis, team handball, track and field, whiffleball, croquet, hiking, dance, archery, badminton and softball.

Demographics

The student population is 67% white, 14% Asian, 11% two or more races, 6% Hispanic, 1% black and 1% Filipino. Zero percent of students participate in free-lunch programs, and less than 1 percent are in an English-learning program.

Daily breaks

Between each class a five-minute break is offered. In addition to this, brunch is a 10-minute break (much like elementary-school "recess") in the morning, and lunch is a thirty-five-minute break.

Students may purchase food from the Food Service. Its brunch menu includes milk (chocolate or plain), many kinds of cereal, soft pretzels, pita chips and hummus, bread sticks, fresh fruit (free),fresh baked muffins, bagels and cream cheese, and drinks.

The school no longer has an open campus for lunch but students do have the option to eat outside or at the learnscape lunch park. They can also eat in the chill zone where they can play board games and hang out with friends.

Library 
The Piedmont Middle School Library is run by Ms. White, Ms. Gulassa and Ms. Lu and has a large variety of books for all the middle school students. They have over 10,000 books not including books for research and biographies. It also has an excellent selection of textbooks and learning materials. Students who cannot participate in other classes such as P.E. spend that time in the library and then return to their normal classes.

Notable alumni

Actor Clint Eastwood attended what was in the mid-1940s Piedmont Junior High School.  Among Eastwood's classmates was Joseph W. "Joe" Knowland, who later became the publisher of the Oakland Tribune.

See also

Piedmont, California
Piedmont High School

References

External links
Piedmont Middle School Official Website
Piedmont Educational Foundation

Public middle schools in California
Piedmont, California
Schools in Alameda County, California
1960s establishments in California